Free-market anarchism, or market anarchism, also known as free-market anti-capitalism, is the branch of anarchism that advocates a free-market economic system based on voluntary interactions without the involvement of the state. A form of individualist anarchism, and libertarian socialism, it is based on the economic theories of mutualism and individualist anarchism in the United States.

Samuel Edward Konkin III's agorism is a strand of left-wing market anarchism that has been associated with left-libertarianism in the United States. Anarcho-capitalism has also been referred to synonymously as free-market anarchism or market anarchism.

Theory 
According to libertarian scholar Sheldon Richman, left-libertarians "favor worker solidarity vis-à-vis bosses, support poor people's squatting on government or abandoned property, and prefer that corporate privileges be repealed before the regulatory restrictions on how those privileges may be exercised", seeing Walmart as a "symbol of corporate favoritism" which is "supported by highway subsidies and eminent domain", viewing "the fictive personhood of the limited-liability corporation with suspicion" and "doubt[ing] that Third World sweatshops would be the "best alternative" in the absence of government manipulation". These left-libertarians "tend to eschew electoral politics, having little confidence in strategies that work through the government. They prefer to develop alternative institutions and methods of working around the state".

Kevin Carson's Studies in Mutualist Political Economy helped to stimulate the growth of new-style mutualism, articulating a version of the labor theory of value incorporating ideas drawn from the Austrian School of economics. Other market-oriented left-libertarians have declined to embrace mutualist views of real property while sharing the mutualist opposition to corporate hierarchies and wealth concentration.

Gary Chartier has joined Kevin Carson, Charles W. Johnson and others in maintaining that because of its heritage and its emancipatory goals and potential, radical market anarchism should be seen by its proponents and by others as part of the socialist tradition and that market anarchists can and should call themselves socialists. 

Roderick T. Long is an advocate of "build[ing] worker solidarity. On the one hand, this means formal organisation, including unionization – but I'm not talking about the prevailing model of "business unions," [...] but real unions, the old-fashioned kind, committed to the working class and not just union members, and interested in worker autonomy, not government patronage".

See also 

 Anarchism and capitalism
 Anarcho-capitalism
 Geolibertarianism
 Individualist anarchism
 Issues in anarchism
 Market socialism
 Mutualism
 Ricardian socialism

References

Bibliography

External links 
 Alliance of the Libertarian Left
 Center for a Stateless Society
 Molinari Institute

 
Anti-capitalism
Anarchist schools of thought
Libertarianism by form
Political science terminology